"Tonight Is the Night" is the first official single by the American singer-songwriter Outasight, released by Warner Bros. Records. It was produced by Cook Classics and is on his first album, Nights Like These. The song peaked at number 38 on the US Billboard Hot 100 and was certified platinum by the Recording Industry Association of America. The song also reached number 18 in Australia and number 53 in Canada.} A music video was released, directed by Dori Oskowitz.

Use in advertisements
The song was used in advertisements for the premiere of the Australian reality show The Shire and in commercials for the 84th Academy Awards on ABC, and was the theme song for WWE's Raw 1000 on July 23, 2012. Honda uses this song in TV advertisements for its Summer Clearance Event. It is also used in Pizza Hut commercials.

The track is used in Pepsi's "Who's Next" campaign. The advertisement shows an anonymous young singer sipping from a Pepsi can while he is preparing for his show. While the song is being played, renowned "icon" singers appear, in order of appearance Michael Jackson, Alfonso Ribeiro, Ray Charles, Britney Spears, Kanye West and Mariah Carey. The final shot goes back to the new aspiring artist while "who's next?" slogan is splashed on the screen. The advertisement ends with the catch phrase: "Where there's Pepsi, there's music".

Track listing

Charts and certifications

Weekly charts

Certifications

References

2011 debut singles
2011 songs
Songs written by Cook Classics
Warner Records singles